(The birth), WAB 69, is a  song composed by Anton Bruckner in 1851 during his stay in St. Florian.

History 
Bruckner composed this work on a text of an unknown author in 1851 during his stay in St. Florian. On 19 March 1852, he dedicated the song to his friend Josef Seiberl to celebrate his name day. It is not known whether it was performed at that time.

The original manuscript is stored in the archive of Wels.

Text 
Die Geburt uses a text by an unknown author.

Music 
The 25-bar long work in D-flat major is scored for  choir. The  (ardent) first 12 bars, in periods of 4 bars, have to be repeated three times - presumably foreseen for four couplets, of which only one has been retrieved. From bar 13, Und hast du das deine dann redlich getan, the Schubert-like song evolves slower to the end.

References

Sources 
 August Göllerich, Anton Bruckner. Ein Lebens- und Schaffens-Bild,  – posthumous edited by Max Auer by G. Bosse, Regensburg, 1932
 Anton Bruckner – Sämtliche Werke, Band XXIII/2:  Weltliche Chorwerke (1843–1893), Musikwissenschaftlicher Verlag der Internationalen Bruckner-Gesellschaft, Angela Pachovsky and Anton Reinthaler (Editor), Vienna, 1989
 Cornelis van Zwol, Anton Bruckner 1824–1896 – Leven en werken, uitg. Thoth, Bussum, Netherlands, 2012. 
 Uwe Harten, Anton Bruckner. Ein Handbuch. , Salzburg, 1996. .
 Crawford Howie, Anton Bruckner - A documentary biography, online revised edition

External links 
 
 Die Geburt Des-Dur, WAB 69 – Critical discography by Hans Roelofs 
 A life performance by the Kenyon College Männerchor can be heard on YouTube: Die Geburt, WAB 69

Weltliche Chorwerke by Anton Bruckner
1851 compositions
Compositions in D-flat major